Gloria Fluxà Thienemann (born June 1981) is a Spanish businessperson. She is vice-chairman and chief sustainability officer of the family business, Iberostar Hotels & Resorts.

Education 
Fluxà has degrees in Business Administration from Villanova University and Accelerated Executive Development Program at IMD Business School.  She participated in the Owner/President Management Program, Harvard Business School, Boston, US.

Career 
In January 2005, Fluxà joined the family business, Iberostar Group. Since 2018 she holds the position of vice-chairman and chief sustainability officer. She is a trustee and the chairman of Iberostar Foundation, member of the board at Endeavor Spain and member of the international advisory board at the Swiss Hospitality Management School in Lausanne.

In May 2018, she was named a “Young Global Leader” by the World Economic Forum due to her efforts in advancing the company's approach to sustainable tourism, particularly in the area of marine and oceans preservation with the movement “Wave of Change”.  This project is focused on three areas: reducing plastic consumption, promoting sustainable fishing and improving coastal health.

References 

1981 births
Living people
21st-century Spanish businesspeople
Spanish expatriates in Switzerland
International Institute for Management Development alumni
Gloria
Villanova University alumni